Hiralal Mukherjee (14 October 1886 – 14 December 1962) was Indian professional footballer who played as a goalkeeper. He was a member of the "Immortal XI", of Mohun Bagan, that won the IFA Shield in 1911.

Early life
On 14 October 1886, Mukherjee was born to a middle-class family in the erstwhile Bengal Presidency of British India. He grew up and had his early education in the Bagbazar locality of Calcutta (now Kolkata). At a young age, he lost his father and following which he moved to Howrah with his elder sister. Passing the entrance exam at the Howarh Zilla School in 1904, he got himself enrolled at the Bengal Engineering College (now Indian Institute of Engineering Science and Technology) in Shibpur. This was when he quit his studies and took to football as a profession. He was encouraged to take up goalkeeping by Sailen Basu, an official at Mohun Bagan, the club which Mukherjee first played for.

Career
Mukherjee began his club career with Mohun Bagan in 1906. As a goalkeeper, he was known for his ability to storm into the tackles of the opposition strikers.

He was part of the team that won the IFA Shield in 1911, when they beat East Yorkshire Regiment 2–1 in the final. The winning team was titled "Immortal XI" following the victory. This is viewed as a turning point in Indian football, as a team of Indian natives on bare foot had beaten a well coached British team. Mukherjee's best moment at the tournament came when he saved three penalties against Rangers Football Club in the second game of the tournament, a match that Bagan won 2–1.

References

1886 births
1962 deaths
Indian footballers
Footballers from Kolkata
Association football goalkeepers
Mohun Bagan AC players